Michael McGrath (born 23 August 1976) is an Irish Fianna Fáil politician who has served as Minister for Finance since December 2022. He previously served as Minister for Public Expenditure and Reform from 2020 to 2022. He has been a Teachta Dála (TD) for the Cork South-Central constituency since 2007.

Early life
McGrath was born in Cork in 1976. He studied commerce at University College Cork and later qualified as a chartered accountant. His parents are described as having been non-political.

Political career
He was a member of Passage West Town Council from 1999 to 2007, and a member of Cork County Council for the Carrigaline local electoral area from 2004 to 2007. McGrath was first elected to the Dáil in 2007, and subsequently, he co-oped his brother Séamus to his county council seat. Séamus would, reportedly, become McGrath's closest political confidant.  

McGrath was one of the few Fianna Fáil TDs to survive their disastrous performance in the 2011 general election. In the aftermath, McGrath became the Opposition Spokesperson on Public Expenditure and Financial Sector Reform, but also held the role of Spokesperson for Finance following the death of Brian Lenihan in June 2011.

McGrath represented Fianna Fáil in the Oireachtas delegation that met the Bundestag's Budgetary and European Affairs committees, in Berlin in late January 2012. He represented Fianna Fáil in talks on government formation in 2016 and 2020.

At the 2020 general election, McGrath outpolled his party leader Micheál Martin, with whom he shares a constituency.  

In June 2020, following the formation of a coalition government between Fianna Fáil, Fine Gael and the Green Party, McGrath was appointed as Minister for Public Expenditure and Reform. McGrath became Minister for Finance on 17 December 2022 as part of a cabinet reshuffle when Leo Varadkar succeeded Micheál Martin as Taoiseach as agreed in the coalition deal between Fianna Fáil, Fine Gael and the Green Party.

Political views and profile
McGrath has been described as being on the right wing of Fianna Fáil and as conservative, both socially and economically. A father of seven children by the time he was 41, McGrath was starkly opposed to the legalisation of abortion in the Republic of Ireland when it was put to a referendum in 2016. Fiscally, McGrath has opposed calls from within his own party to increase social welfare allowances and has been called a proponent of economic orthodoxy. A chartered accountant, McGrath has been described as "technocratic" and likened to a civil servant in his approach to politics. His grasp of economics, as well as his attention to detail, have been praised as his strong points. 

, many political commentators in Ireland have suggested that McGrath is a potent contender for the leadership of Fianna Fáil the next time the position comes up for contention.

References

External links
Michael McGrath's page on the Fianna Fáil website

 

1976 births
Living people
Alumni of University College Cork
Fianna Fáil TDs
Members of the 30th Dáil
Members of the 31st Dáil
Members of the 32nd Dáil
Members of the 33rd Dáil
Politicians from County Cork
Ministers for Public Expenditure, National Development Plan Delivery and Reform